Andrew Tourell (18 January 1946 - 17 January 2004) was an English actor. He was known for his extensive work in television and theatre.

Career

Television
Tourell began his career working with the Swansea Repertory Company in 1967, appearing in plays including The Ghost Train as Saul Hodgkin, The Winslow Boy as Dickie Winslow, Dial M For Murder as Inspector Hubbard and Home at Seven as Dr. Sparling.

He was best known on television for his role as Geoffrey Ballard in Waiting For God where he appeared in 46 out of a total of 47 episodes. The son of leading character Tom (Graham Crowden), Geoffrey was known for his genial and mild mannered personality, yet could be insufferably dull at times. Although a successful businessman, his marriage to Marion (Sandra Payne) is a disaster; he frequently has to deal with her abusive, drunken and frequently adulterous behaviour. He eventually suffers a nervous breakdown in Series 5, where he leaves Marion, resigns from his position in the company and briefly reinvents himself as the rebellious biker 'Fatboy Higgins'.

Tourell also made appearances in supporting roles in a number of notable sitcoms including Napley in It Takes a Worried Man, Anthony Black in No Place Like Home, Mr. Gerrard, the prosecution counsel in the Only Fools and Horses episode 'Hole in One', Benson in Terry & June and Graham, the estranged (and later ex) husband of Penny (Jan Francis) in two episodes of Just Good Friends.

In 1982, he appeared in the Doctor Who serial Black Orchid as Constable Cummings, who assists the Fifth Doctor (Peter Davison) with his investigation into the murder of two servants at a fancy dress party. He also played Mark Smith in an episode of the long running soap opera Crossroads.

Stage
In addition to his work in television, Tourell also frequently played roles on stage, appearing in various productions including Boston Story as George Fenton at the Arts Theatre, Belfast; An Italian Straw Hat as Nonacourt and The Owl and Pussycat as Plum Pudding Flea at the Lyceum Theatre, Crewe. He later became director of productions for the Byre Theatre Company at the Byre Theatre, St Andrews, between 1972-5, where he directed a number of plays including The Importance of Being Earnest, The Boy Friend and Wait Until Dark. He also acted in various productions at the Byre, including Barefoot in the Park as Paul Bratter and Babes in the Wood as Friar Tuck.  After leaving the Byre, Tourell directed further plays including An Evening with Marcel Proust at the Maximus Actors Arena, London and Revenge which ran at the Finborough Theatre, London in November 1982. He briefly returned to the Byre in 1979, where he directed Candida by George Bernard Shaw.

Personal life 
Tourell married the actress Janet Marshall in 1975, with whom he had worked at the Byre Theatre and Crewe Theatre Company. He died suddenly from a heart attack, one day before his 58th birthday on 17th January 2004 in Haywards Heath.

Filmography

References

External links 
 
Andew Tourell at Aveleyman
Andrew Tourell at Theatricalia

1946 births
2004 deaths
British actors
People from Islington (district)